Neoptychodes candidus is a species of beetle in the family Cerambycidae. It was described by Henry Walter Bates in 1885. It is known from Colombia and Costa Rica.

References

Lamiini
Beetles described in 1885